Craig Price may refer to:

 Craig Price (murderer) (born 1973), serial killer in Rhode Island
 Craig Price (rugby union) (born 1989), Welsh rugby union player
 Craig Pryce (director), American Director